Aruküla is a village in Lääneranna Parish, Pärnu County, in southwestern Estonia. It has a population of 76 (as of 1 January 2011).

Uue-Varbla Manor (Neu-Werpel) is located in Aruküla. It was established in 1799 by detaching it from the nearby Vana-Varbla Manor (Alt-Werpel). The Early-Classical wooden main building was constructed around the year 1800. Nowadays it houses the Varbla Museum.

References

External links
Varbla Museum 
Uue-Varbla Manor at Estonian Manors Portal

Villages in Pärnu County